Invités Surprises (English: Guests surprised) is a comic film of Côte d'Ivoire issued in 2008, directed by Mike Yoboué.

Plot
Mr. and Mrs. Kalou organize the birthday of their daughter, imagined as a small ceremony with five guests. The five guests envisaged become twenty, Gohou (the president of the young people of the district), Abass and another friends will sow the discord.

All the scenes of film are held in the house of the Kalou couple.

Production
Realization: Mike Yoboué
Scenario: Mike Yoboué
Producer: Rocco & Xavier
Music: Charles N'Doumi
photograph: Brahima D
Camera: Timi serges
Script: Yatish
Manager: Habib Baye

Cast
 Nastou Traoré: Madame Kalou
 Michel Bohiri: Monsieur Kalou
 Michel Gohou: Gohou
 Abass IBN: Abasse
 Marie-Laure Zouzouo: Laure
 Junior Kolie
 Hippolyte Kouadio
 Sabine Afry Oliko
 Anoma Luc André
 Fatim Coulibaly
 Maimouna Doumbouya
 Samuel Oberlin
 Oswald Kouamé
 Nina Djahi
 Octavie Doudjon
 Anne-Lisse N'Guessan
 Shélémia Ibo

2008 films
Films set in Africa
French comedy films
Ivorian comedy films
Films shot in Ivory Coast
2000s French films